Jack Robert Binns (born May 13, 1933, in Oregon) was the U.S. Ambassador to Honduras from 1980 to 1981. Binns is a 1956 graduate of the United States Naval Academy.

Now retired from the Foreign Service, Binns is an author and resides in Tucson, Arizona.  In 2000, he published his memoirs of his time as an ambassador.

References

Bibliography
The United States in Honduras, 1980-1981: An Ambassador's Memoir (2000)
"Weighing Bush's Foreign Policy." The Forum: Vol. 1: No. 1, Article 3. (2002)

External links
Amazon.com Reviewer Profile for Jack R. Binns
Library of Congress Oral History

1933 births
Living people
Ambassadors of the United States to Honduras
United States Naval Academy alumni
United States Foreign Service personnel
People from Tucson, Arizona